“Pigeon Feathers” is a work of short fiction by John Updike which first appeared in The New Yorker on April 27, 1956. The story was collected in Pigeon Feathers and Other Stories (1962) by Alfred A. Knopf.

“Pigeon Feathers” was listed among the recipients of the O. Henry Award in 1962.

Plot

David Kern, a boy in his mid-teens, moves with his mother to a rural farm, a displacement from his former home that he finds traumatic. At his new house, David discovers a copy of H. G. Wells’ The Outline of History. In this work, Wells portrays  Jesus of Nazareth as a purely historical figure and not of divine origins. David is cast into a crisis of faith which causes him to question the existence of a supreme being. While in the family’s outhouse, he experiences a horrifying premonition of his unredeemed soul. Neither David’s parents nor the Lutheran minister can provide satisfactory answers to his questions regarding his emerging dilemma.

In an effort to distract her son from his suffering, his mother mentions that his grandmother would like the numerous pigeons culled from the rafters of her barn. David takes his Remington .22 rifle, a recent gift from his parents and, after some hesitation, begins to systematically shoot the birds. Though David warms to his task, he becomes dismayed at the slaughter and stops. While his mother helps him to bury the birds, David examines the feathers of the dead animals, admiring their color and texture. David realizes that where there is exquisite design in nature there can be purpose in life and ultimate salvation.

Theme

Ostensibly a coming-of-age story, "Pigeon Feathers" concerns a youth’s “crisis of faith” that threatens to destroy the religious foundations of his Lutheran upbringing.

Literary critic Richard Detweiler  writes: “Its hero, the fourteen-year-old David Kern, suffers from a terrifying religious crisis; the force of the tale is in rendering credible the experience of faith and doubt that takes place in an adolescent mind.”

The Kern family move from the ancestral farm, from fictional Olinger to the rural Firetown, has “autobiographical contours.” The event is a literary dramatization of Updike's family displacement, under the direction of his mother, Linda Updike, from the town of Shillington, Pennsylvania, to the rural village of Plowville, Pennsylvania when he was a boy.

Literary critic Richard Detwieler explains that the “alienation” that David Kern experiences a result of this move “finds expression in a religious dilemma.” Detwieler emphasizes that “the element of displacement is crucial to the story.” Detwieler writes:

In handing the dead pigeons after killing them, David Kern has an epiphany at the burial site with his mother. Literary critic William H. Pritchard provides the “often quoted” closing passage of the story:

Pritchard adds: “Updike’s fiction finds that David has undergone an initiation here, is now complicit with sin and death, having killed the pigeons, but also enabled by the experience…”

Generalizing on the story's denouement, literary critic Kathleen Verduin writes: “In Updike, what is ordinary may quickly turn into an epiphany and no phenomenon is therefore too small to merit attention.”

Footnotes

Sources 
Allen, Mary. 1976. John Updike's Love of "Dull Bovine Beauty" from The Necessary Blankness: Women in Major American Fiction of the Sixties. from University of Illinois Press, 1976 in John Updike: Modern Critical Views, Harold Bloom, editor. pp. 69-95 
Begley, Adam. 2014. Updike. Harpercollins Publishers, New York. 
Detweiler, Robert. 1984. John Updike. Twayne Publishers, G. K. Hall & Co., Boston, Massachusetts.  (Paperback).
Macnaughton, William R. 1982. Critical Essays on John Updike. G. K. Hall & Co., Boston, Massachusetts.  
Olster, Stacey. 2006. The Cambridge Companion to John Updike. Cambridge University Press, Cambridge.  (paperback)
Pritchard, Richard H.. 2000. Updike: America’s Man of Letters. Steerforth Press, Southroyalton, Vermont.
Verduin, Kathleen]. 1982. “Fatherly Presences: John Updike’s Place in a Protestant Tradition.” in Critical Essays on John Updike. G. K. Hall & Co. (1982),  William R. Macnaughton, editor. pp. 254–268. 
Versluys, Kristiaan. 2006. “Nakedness” or Realism in Updike’s Early Short Stories in The Cambridge Companion to John Updike (2006).  Stacey Olster, editor. pp. 29–41 Cambridge University Press, Cambridge.  (paperback).

1962 short story collections
Short story collections by John Updike
Alfred A. Knopf books